Jonathan Curiel (born July 10, 1960) is an American journalist, in San Francisco.

Biography
Curiel was educated at University of California at Berkeley and the University of Oxford.

In 1993-1994, he lived in Lahore, Pakistan, where he taught at the University of the Punjab as a Fulbright Scholar. He was a staff writer for the San Francisco Chronicle. San Francisco Chronicle, Columbia Journalism Review, and Tablet Magazine,

Curiel's book Al' America won the 2008 American Book Award. The Washington Post reviewed the work saying, In the wake of a bruising presidential campaign, Americans of all faiths ought to consider how to strengthen ties to their Arab and Muslim fellow citizens. Curiel's book, though short-sighted in some ways, can play a role in persuading the skeptical that Arab and Muslim traditions are already woven deeply into the American fabric. ·

In the Fall 2009 semester, he taught a journalism course at the University of California, Los Angeles. In February 2010, he taught at Whitman College. In 2011, Curiel joined the staff of the Wikimedia Foundation as Development Communications Manager.

In 2015, Curiel's book Islam in America was published by I.B.Tauris.

Bibliography
 
 Islam in America. I.B.Tauris. 2015. .

References

External links
Curiel's website
Curiel's blog
"Jonathan Curiel Interview", The Red Alert
"Speaker: Jonathan Curiel", Fora.tv
“Islam in America”: A Conversation with Jonathan Curiel (Book Q & A)

Living people
Columbia University alumni
Alumni of the University of Oxford
American male journalists
Journalists from California
Writers from San Francisco
University of California, Los Angeles faculty
Whitman College faculty
Academic staff of the University of the Punjab
1960 births
American expatriate academics
American expatriates in Pakistan
American Book Award winners